BloodRayne 3 may refer to:

BloodRayne: The Third Reich, the third movie in the film series
BloodRayne: Betrayal, the third video game in the series